The V Cavalry Corps ( literally: Higher Cavalry Command 5) was a formation of the German Army in World War I.

V Cavalry Corps 
During the Courland Offensive a wide gap opened between the Army of the Niemen and 10th Army.  Set up by the Army of the Niemen as temporary Cavalry Corps Schmettow, commanded by Generalleutnant Egon Graf von Schmettow. Established 18 August 1915. Redesignated 20 November 1916 as 58th Corps (z.b.V.).

58th Corps 
58th Corps (z.b.V.) was formed on 20 November 1916 by the redesignation of V Cavalry Corps.  As the need for large mounted cavalry formations diminished as the war went on, the existing Cavalry Corps increasingly took on the characteristics of a normal Corps Command.  This culminated in them being redesignated as "General Commands for Special Use" Generalkommandos zur besonderen Verwendung (Genkdo z.b.V.).

By the end of the war, the Corps was serving on the Western Front as part of the 5th Army with the following composition:
 240th Division
 15th Bavarian Division
 52nd Division
 31st Division

Commanders 
V Cavalry Corps / 58th Corps had the following commanders during its existence:

See also 

German Army (German Empire)
German Army order of battle, Western Front (1918)
German cavalry in World War I

References

Bibliography 
 
 

Corps of Germany in World War I
Cavalry corps of Germany
Military units and formations established in 1916
Military units and formations disestablished in 1919

de:Höheres Kavallerie-Kommando